Toma Ketama! is a studio album released by Spanish band Ketama in September 12, 2000. The album was produced by Cachorro López and earned the band a Latin Grammy Award nomination for Best Pop Vocal Album.

Track listing
This information adapted from Allmusic.

Certifications

References

2000 albums
Ketama albums
Spanish-language albums
Albums produced by Cachorro López